Elastic therapeutic tape, also called kinesiology tape or kinesiology therapeutic tape, Kinesio tape, k-tape, or KT is an elastic cotton strip with an acrylic adhesive that is purported to ease pain and disability from athletic injuries and a variety of other physical disorders. In individuals with chronic musculoskeletal pain, research suggests that elastic taping may help relieve pain, but not more than other treatment approaches, and no evidence indicates that it can reduce disability in chronic pain cases.

No convincing scientific evidence indicates that such products provide any demonstrable benefit in excess of a placebo, with some declaring it a pseudoscientific treatment.

History
Kenzo Kase, a Japanese-American chiropractor, developed the product in the 1970s. The company he founded markets variants under the brand name "Kinesio" and takes legal action to prevent the word being used as a genericised trademark.

A surge in popularity resulted after the product was donated to Olympic athletes in the 2008 Beijing Summer Olympics and 2012 London Summer Olympics. The tapes' prominence and mass introduction to the general public have been attributed to Kerri Walsh who wore the tape on her shoulder, and who along with Misty May-Treanor dominated the 2008 beach volleyball event. In 2012, science journalist Brian Dunning speculated on why he had not seen "a single athlete, pro beach volleyball players included, wear Kinesio Tape outside of the Olympics". He believes that "sponsorship dollars may be entirely responsible for the popularity of Kinesio Tape during televised events."

Properties

The product is a type of thin, elastic cotton tape that can stretch up to 140% of its original length. As a result, if the tape is applied stretched greater than its normal length, it will "recoil" after being applied and therefore create a pulling force on the skin. This elastic property allows much greater range of motion compared to traditional white athletic tape and can also be left on for long periods before reapplication.

Designed to mimic human skin, with roughly the same thickness and elastic properties, the tape can be stretched 30–40% longitudinally. It is a latex-free material with acrylic adhesive, which is heat activated. The cotton fibers allow for evaporation and quicker drying leading to longer wear time, up to 4 days. How the tape is claimed to affect the body is dependent on the location and how it is applied; the stretch direction, the shape, and the location all supposedly play a role in the tape's hypothetical function.

Effectiveness
People claim the tape has several theoretical benefits. One of those is correcting the alignment of weak muscles as well as facilitating joint motion as a result of the tape's recoiling qualities. Additionally, some claim the tape “lifts” the skin, increasing the space below it, and increasing blood flow and circulation of lymphatic fluids (swelling). This increase in the interstitial space purportedly reduces pressure on the body's nociceptors, which detect pain, and stimulates mechanoreceptors, to improve overall joint proprioception.

In the article, Kinesio Tape for Athletes: A Big Help, or Hype?, Web MD reports that "There has not been conclusive scientific or medical evidence to confirm the effectiveness of the tape."

In the 2012 article "Scientists sceptical as athletes get all taped up", Reuters reported that "In a review of all the scientific research so far, published in the Sports Medicine journal in February, researchers found 'little quality evidence to support the use of Kinesio tape over other types of elastic taping in the management or prevention of sports injuries". Some researchers claim that what athletes are experiencing is just a placebo effect.

In July 2012, Steven Novella writing in Science-Based Medicine in the article "Olympic Pseudoscience'",  examined the use of KT in the larger context of "sports-related pseudoscience". Novella says "The world of sports competition is rife with pseudoscience,
false claims, dubious products, superstitions, and magical charms." Novella concluded that "Consumers should be very skeptical of claims made for products marketed as athletic performance enhancing."

In August 2012, science journalist Brian Dunning reports in "Kinesio Tape: The Evidence" that positive studies of the tape are the result of people being deceived by a "stage magician's trick" – which he describes in detail – that is used to fool subjects into thinking strength or flexibility is being affected, when they are not. He reports that kinesio tape is claimed to be good for a plethora of issues including "pain management, injury treatment, injury prevention, enhanced performance, increased range of motion, and just about anything else an athlete might want." He concludes: "It sounds like a miracle — one simple product that does everything you can imagine. In short, a textbook snake oil product."

A 2012 journal article from the Journal of Hand Therapy reported on a double blind study, where elastic therapeutic tape may be of some assistance to clinicians in improving pain-free active range of motion immediately after tape application for patients with shoulder pain. Utilization of the tape for decreasing pain intensity or disability for young patients with suspected shoulder tendonitis/impingement is not supported. After this short period there was no difference in improvement versus using sham tape. Based on two different studies, kinesio tape showed quicker drainage than manually and better patient compliance.

A 2012 meta analysis found that the efficacy of elastic therapeutic tape in pain relief was trivial, because no reviewed study found clinically important results. The tape "may have a small beneficial role in improving strength, range of motion in certain injured cohorts, and force sense error compared with other elastic tapes, but further studies are needed to confirm these findings".
The same article concluded: "KT had some substantial effects on muscle activity, but it was unclear whether these changes were beneficial or harmful. In conclusion, there was little quality evidence to support the use of KT over other types of elastic taping in the management or prevention of sports injuries"

A 2013 journal article examined the use of Kinesio Tape and Stretching on shoulder joint range of motion (ROM). Participants with no history of shoulder injuries were assigned to three treatment groups. One using Kinesio Tape only, one stretching only, and one using both Kinesio Tape and stretching. It was found that the usage of Kinesio Tape can increase shoulder ROM, and that stretching had no effect on shoulder ROM if being used alone or when coupled with the Kinesio Tape.

A 2014 meta analysis looked at methodological quality of studies, along with overall population effect, and suggested that studies of lower methodological quality are more likely to report beneficial effects of elastic therapeutic taping, thus indicating the perceived effect of using kinesio taping is not real. It also suggested that applying elastic therapeutic tape, "to facilitate muscular contraction has no, or only negligible, effects on muscle strength".

A 2015 meta analysis found that the taping provided more pain relief than no treatment at all, but was not better than other treatment approaches in patients with chronic musculoskeletal pain. The same meta analysis did not find any significant changes in disability as a result of taping.

A 2016 journal article in the Journal of Exercise Therapy and Rehabilitation conducted a study to test if the colors of Kinesio Tape had any effect on patient perception in patients with tight trapezius muscles. The study had fifty female subjects with tight trapezius muscle. Five different colored tapes were used, red, blue, black, white, and beige. It was found that the color of the tape might affect the feelings of the participants, but no difference to the trapezius muscle was noted.

In June 2016, an article published by The Physician and Sportsmedicine found that treatment for Pes anserinus bursitis using Kinesio Tape significantly decreased pain and swelling when compared to Naproxen (an anti inflammatory medicine) + Physical Therapy. Both forms of treatment were effective but the Kinesio Taping was far more effective on reduction of pain, based on a visual analog scale (VAS) and swelling based on the swelling scores. Swelling score was determined by the use of soft tissue sonography.

In March 2018, Science-Based Medicine again examined KT in response to its public use at the 2018 Winter Olympics in the article A Miscellany of Medical Malarkey Episode 3: The Revengening. The article reports that:

In November 2018, Science-Based Medicine describes a new study published the same month in the online journal BMC Sports Science, Medicine and Rehabilitation which examines the effectiveness of different colors of kinesiology tape, as well as reexamining general effectiveness of kinesiology tape against a placebo. Describing the conclusions of the study, they write:

See also
 Athletic taping
 Buddy wrapping
 Elastic bandage
 Self-adhering bandage
 Kinesiology

References

External links
 

Adhesive tape
Alternative medicine
Pseudoscience